Bill McCarthy is the outgoing Director of Policy for NHS England.  He is an economist. His previous roles include Chief Executive at NHS Yorkshire and the Humber, Chief Executive at City of York Council and Director-General at the Department of Health (2005–07) responsible for health and social care strategy, system reform, and policy development and implementation.

He was said by the Health Service Journal to be the 21st most powerful person in the English NHS in December 2013. His salary (£175000) was the twenty-eighth highest in the NHS in 2013.

McCarthy's departure from his post as NHS England Director of Policy was announced on 18 March 2014.  He will leave the NHS after working three months' notice to become deputy vice chancellor (operations) at the University of Bradford.

References

External links
 Who’s who – the NHS England board

Administrators in the National Health Service